Afternoon Tales the Morning Never Knew is the second and final album by The Birdwatcher, the alias used by Dan Matz, frontman of Windsor for the Derby.

Track listing
All songs written by Dan Matz, except where noted.

 "Afternoon Tales" – 4:04
 "Empty Boat" – 4:34
 "Drawn" – 5:03
 "A Thousand Ants" – 4:04
 "Country Music" – 3:37
 "Trouble" (Jim Kimball) – 5:10
 "Crocodile" – 3:04
 "The Hush" – 4:45
 "Afternoon (Reprise)" – 1:28
 "Sunset Park" (Kamen Goddard/Dan Matz) – 2:15
 "Astoria 5PM" – 4:23
 "Air Defines" – 4:37

References

External links
Arena Rock Recording Co.

2002 albums
Arena Rock Recording Company albums